Antonio Aleotti (died 1527)  was an Italian painter, first mentioned in records in 1494 and active in Ferrara. Born in Argenta, he is also known as Antonio dell'Argento.  He painted frescoes in the Chiesa della Morte in Ferrara.

His altarpiece of the Virgin and child enthroned, with St Anthony the Abbot and the Archangel Michael was painted in 1510 for the Hospital of Saint Antonio in Cesena, and is now in the city's art gallery.

He died in Cesena in 1527.

Gallery

References

Sources

People from the Province of Ferrara
15th-century Italian painters
Italian male painters
Italian Renaissance painters
Painters from Ferrara
1527 deaths